HMS Emerald was an , of the Royal Navy, built at the Pembroke Dockyard and launched on 18 August 1876.

Service history
She commenced service on the Australia Station in September 1878. She escorted Sir Hercules Robinson, the Governor of New Zealand from Sydney to Auckland in May 1879.

Emerald, under Captain Maxwell, visited the Ellice Islands in 1881. She left the Australia Station in October 1881 and returned to England.

Emerald was refitted and rearmed in 1882 in England and placed into reserve. She commissioned for the North America and West Indies Station in 1886, before returning to England in 1892 and again being placed into reserve. She was converted into a powder hulk in 1895 at Portsmouth.

Fate
She was sold on 10 July 1906 to Cox, Falmouth.

Notes

References
Bastock, John (1988), Ships on the Australia Station, Child & Associates Publishing Pty Ltd; Frenchs Forest, Australia. 

1876 ships
Ships built in Pembroke Dock
Victorian-era corvettes of the United Kingdom
Emerald-class corvettes